Ponca City is a city in Kay County in the U.S. state of Oklahoma. The city was named after the Ponca tribe. Ponca City had a population of 25,387 at the time of the 2010 census- and a population of 24,424 in the 2020 census.

History

Ponca City was created in 1893 as "New Ponca" after the United States opened the Cherokee Outlet for European-American settlement during the Cherokee Strip land run, the largest land run in United States history. The site for Ponca City was selected for its proximity to the Arkansas River and the presence of a freshwater spring near the river. The city was laid out by Burton Barnes, who drew up the first survey of the city and sold certificates for the lots he had surveyed. After the drawing for lots in the city was completed, Barnes was elected the city's first mayor.

Another city, Cross, vied with Ponca City to become the leading city in the area. After the Atchison, Topeka and Santa Fe Railway had opened a station in Cross, people thought it would not open another in Ponca City because of the two cities' proximity. New Ponca boosters eventually secured a station after offering the Santa Fe station agent two town lots and the free relocation of his house from Cross. Ponca City reportedly obtained its first boxcar station by some Ponca City supporters going to Cross and returning with the town's station pulled behind them. Cross eventually became defunct, and today, what was once Cross is now a residential district in Ponca City. In 1913, New Ponca changed its name to Ponca City.

Petroleum industry

Ponca City's history and economy has been shaped chiefly by the ebb and flow of the petroleum industry. E. W. Marland, a Pennsylvania oil man, came to Oklahoma and founded the Marland Oil Company, which once controlled about 10% of the world's oil reserves. He founded the 101 Ranch Oil Company, located on the Miller Brothers 101 Ranch, and drilled his first successful oil well on land he leased in 1911 from the Ponca tribe of American Indians. He was elected in 1932 as a U.S. congressman and in 1934 as governor of Oklahoma.

Marland's exploitation of oil reserves generated growth and wealth that were previously unimaginable on the Oklahoma prairie, and his company virtually built the city from the ground up. Marland and his associates built mansions to display their new wealth, including the Grand Home and the E.W. Marland Estate (once called the "Palace on the Prairie"). Because of this period of wealth and affluence, Ponca City has a high concentration of buildings that exemplify the popular Spanish Colonial Revival architecture of the period, as well as Art Deco-influenced buildings and homes.

The "Roaring '20s" came to an end for Ponca City shortly before the Great Depression. After a successful takeover bid by J.P. Morgan, Jr., son of financier J.P. Morgan, Marland Oil Co. merged with Continental Oil Co. in the late 1920s. It was known as Conoco for more than 70 years. The company maintained its headquarters in Ponca City until 1949 and continued to grow into a global corporation.

During the oil boom years of the 1980s, Conoco was owned by the DuPont Corp., which took control of the company in 1981. After nearly two decades of ownership and an oil bust that crippled Oklahoma's economy in the late 1980s, DuPont sold off its Conoco assets in 1998. In 2002, Conoco merged with Phillips Petroleum (another major petroleum player with roots in northern Oklahoma) to become ConocoPhillips. ConocoPhillips was then the sixth-largest publicly traded oil company in the world, and the third largest in the United States. It maintains a significant presence in its historic home state.

Since the company has reduced its workforce and facilities in the city, the population has declined steadily since the early 1990s. In February 2009, ConocoPhillips announced that all of its remaining nonrefinery operations in Ponca City (representing 750 jobs) would be moved out of the city. The city's recent efforts to grow its economy beyond the petroleum industry have attracted a number of technology, manufacturing, and service jobs.Phillips 66 | Ponca City Refinery

In 2005, ConocoPhillips announced plans to build a $5 million museum across from its Ponca City refinery. Opened to the public in May 2007, the Conoco Museum features artifacts, photographs, and other historical items related to the petroleum industry and its culture in northern Oklahoma. A sister museum, Phillips Petroleum Company Museum, was to be opened in Bartlesville, Oklahoma. Funded by a private foundation, the Conoco Museum charges no admission fee.

In 2012, ConocoPhillips split into two separate companies, with the upstream portion retaining the ConocoPhillips name and the refining and transportation portions taking the name Phillips 66.

Based in Houston, Texas, Phillips 66 continues to operate a 200,000-barrel-per-day refinery. Phillips 66 | Ponca City Refinery in Ponca City.

Native Americans

Until recently, European Americans' accounts of their settlement and the growth of the oil industry in Ponca City have often overshadowed both the long ancient history of indigenous peoples in the area, and those tribes who were resettled to Oklahoma in the 19th century under Indian Removal.

Ponca City is named after the Ponca tribe, part of whom were relocated from Nebraska to northern Oklahoma from 1877 to 1880. Like all of the forced American Indigenous removals of the 19th century, the Poncas' trek was arduous. Followed by the United States government's failure to provide adequate supplies and malaria at their destination, nearly one-third of the Ponca died from illness and exposure. "Out of 700 Ponca who left the Nebraska reservation, 158 died in Oklahoma within two years."

The Ponca protested their conditions. An additional irritant occurred upon the death of Standing Bear's oldest son in 1879. The chief had promised to bury him in his homeland, and about 60 Ponca accompanied him back to Nebraska. The U.S. Army was ordered to arrest them for having left the reservation, and they were confined to Fort Omaha. Most of the tribal members who left eventually returned to the reservation in Oklahoma. With the aid of prominent attorneys working pro bono, Standing Bear filed a writ of habeas corpus challenging his arrest. The case of Standing Bear v. Crook (1879) was a landmark decision in the U.S. District Court, where the judge ruled that Indians had the same legal rights as other United States citizens.

A statue of Standing Bear was erected in his honor at the intersection of Highway 60 and Standing Bear Parkway in Ponca City. In the late 20th century, the city developed a park and museum named in his honor. In addition to the Standing Bear Museum, the 63-acre park includes more than eight fully developed acres with off street parking, a one-acre pond and a walking trail.

The Ponca Nation, which has kept its headquarters south of Ponca City since 1879, played a major part in the development of the Marland Oil Company and the city. Chief White Eagle leased resource-containing portions of the tribe's allotted land to E.W. Marland in 1911 for oil exploration and development.

Since the late 20th century, the Ponca tribe has worked to build its infrastructure and improve services for its people. In February 2006, the tribe received a grant of more than $800,000 from the Shakopee Mdewakanton Sioux Community of Minnesota for debt retirement and economic development.

Nearby north-central tribes are the Kaw, Osage, Otoe-Missouria, Pawnee, and Tonkawa. These are all federally recognized tribes, as is the Ponca Tribe of Indians of Oklahoma. In 1994, the six tribes established the Standing Bear Foundation and Pow-wow, beginning the first of annual shared pow-wows, to which they invite the public. They wanted to build collaboration among the tribes and with the non-Native residents of Ponca City. The pow-wow is now held in Standing Bear Park.

Geography
Ponca City is located in southeastern Kay County at  (36.712422, -97.072431), northwest of the Arkansas River.

The city is near the Arkansas River, the Salt Fork of the Arkansas River, Kaw Lake, and Lake Ponca, which all provide numerous recreational opportunities.

Climate
The Ponca City region of Oklahoma is part of "Tornado Alley". Tornadoes are most common in April, May, and June. During the winters, Ponca City has mostly mild to strong winters with snowstorms and ice. 

Demographics

At the 2010 census,  25,387 people, 10,440 households and 7,019 families resided in the city. The racial makeup of the city was 84.18% White, 2.99% African American, 6.27% Native American, 0.70% Asian, 0.03% Pacific Islander, 2.08% from other races, and 3.75% from two or more races. Hispanics or Latinos of any race were 4.43% of the population.

Of the 10,440 households, 25.4% had children under the age of 18 living with them, 51.3% were married couples living together, 11.1% had a female householder with no husband present, and 34.0% were not families. About 30.0% of all households were made up of individuals, and 13.7% had someone living alone who was 65 years of age or older. The average household size was 2.38 and the average family size was 2.95.

The population was distributed as 26.2% under of 18, 8.5% from 18 to 24, 25.5% from 25 to 44, 22.1% from 45 to 64, and 17.7% who were 65 years of age or older. The median age was 38 years. For every 100 females, there were 90.7 males. For every 100 females age 18 and over, there were 85.8 males.

The median household income was $39,023, and the median family income was $38,839. Males had a median income of $32,283 and females $20,098. The per capita income was $22,566. About 12.7% of families and 17.7% of the population were below the poverty line, including 23.6% of those under age 18 and 9.3% of those age 65 or over.

Economy
E. W. Marland built the Ponca City refinery in 1918 and founded the Marland Oil Company. In 1929, the Continental Oil Company merged with Marland, and the two became Conoco Inc. The Conoco headquarters were in Ponca City until 1949, when they moved to Houston, Texas. In 2002, Conoco Inc. and Phillips Petroleum Company, whose headquarters were in nearby Bartlesville, Oklahoma, merged into ConocoPhillips. In 2012, ConocoPhillips split into two separate companies, with the upstream portion retaining the ConocoPhillips name and the refining and transportation portions taking the name Phillips 66. The Ponca City Refinery, operated by Phillips 66, is the largest refinery in Oklahoma.

The Ponca City Refinery processes a mixture of light, medium, and heavy crude oils. Most of the crude oil processed is received by pipeline from Oklahoma, Texas, and Canada. Infrastructure improvements have enabled the delivery of increased volumes of locally produced advantaged crude oil by pipeline and truck.  The refinery is a high-conversion facility that produces a full range of products, including gasoline, diesel, aviation fuels, liquefied petroleum gas, and anode-grade petroleum coke. Its facilities include two fluid catalytic cracking units, alkylation, delayed coking, naphtha reforming, and hydrodesulfurization units. Finished petroleum products are shipped by truck, railcar, and pipelines to markets throughout the Midcontinent region.

Tourism

Sports
Ponca City hosted minor league baseball from the 1920s through the 1950s. The Ponca City Poncans played from 1923–26, the Ponca City Angels played from 1934–1938 (winning three Western Association championships) and the Ponca City Dodgers (an affiliate of the Brooklyn Dodgers) operated from 1947–1952, Finally, the Ponca City Jets played in the Sooner State League in 1954, only to be replaced by a new club called the Ponca City Cubs in 1955, the last season of professional baseball in Ponca City.

Points of interest
 101 Ranch Memorial
 Cann Memorial Botanical Gardens
 Conoco Museum
 Kaw Lake
 Lake Ponca
 Lew Wentz Public Pool and Golf Course
 Marland Grand Home
 E. W. Marland Mansion
 Pickens Museum
 Ponca Tribe headquarters
 Standing Bear Memorial

Landmarks
Ponca City is home to several landmarks on the National Register of Historic Places, including the Poncan Theatre, the Marland Mansion, and Marland's Grand Home. Ponca City also holds several regional events each year.

Pioneer Woman statue and museum

Ponca City is the site of the Pioneer Woman Museum and the Pioneer Woman statue. The statue was erected to commemorate women pioneers. In the early 1920s, E. W. Marland decided to create a statue commemorating the pioneer woman. Marland was reportedly asked, "E. W., why don't you have ... a statue to the vanishing American, a Ponca, Otoe, or an Osage - a monument of great size?" Marland answered, "the Indian is not the vanishing American - it's the pioneer woman." He sponsored a competition for the winning statue.

In 1927, miniature  sculptures were submitted as part of a competition by 12 U.S. and international sculptors: John Gregory, Maurice Sterne, Hermon Atkins MacNeil, James Earle Fraser, Alexander Stirling Calder, Wheeler Williams, Mario Korbel, F. Lynn Jenkins, Mahonri Young, Arthur Lee, Jo Davidson, and Bryant Baker. They were displayed in 12 cities around the state, where they were viewed by 750,000 people, who voted for their favorite. The original submissions have been on display at the museum at Woolaroc near Bartlesville, Oklahoma since the 1930s.  Marland sold them to Frank Phillips after losing control of the Marland Oil Company.

British-born American sculptor Bryant Baker was chosen as the winner. His full-scale work was unveiled in a public ceremony on April 22, 1930. About 40,000 guests came to hear Will Rogers pay tribute to Oklahoma's pioneers. Widely known as the Pioneer Woman Statue, the bronze sculpture's true name is "Confident".

A related museum commemorating Oklahoma women was opened on September 16, 1958, on the 65th anniversary of the Cherokee Strip land run. It recognizes the work of Native American, as well as European-American women, and their leadership and stamina in creating homes, raising children, and taking care of the work of sustaining life and communities.

Education

Public education
Ponca City Public Schools serves the general population's education requirements. Ponca City Public Schools serve over 5100 students.
High schools
 Ponca City High School (Po-Hi) - serves all 9th- through 12th-grade students in the school district.
 Ombudsman Alternative Education Center  had provided select students the option to take a mostly technology-based route through high school. It was closed after the end of the academic year of 2012-2013.
 WildCat Academy Program, starting in the 2013–2014 year, became the new alternative school for high-school students in the area. Sponsoring the Ponca City WildCat logo, it had changes from the Ombudsman and past alternative schools. 
Middle schools
 East Middle School serves Ponca City's estimated 380 eighth-grade students in the Ponca City Public School system.
 West Middle School  serves most of the district's sixth- and seventh-grade students.
Elementary schools
Ponca City has currently eight elementary schools to serve the district's pre-K through fifth-grade students:
 Garfield Elementary
 Liberty Elementary
 Lincoln Elementary
 Roosevelt Elementary
 Trout Elementary
 Union Elementary
 McCord Elementary (has a sixth grade )
 Washington Elementary became the Alternative School, but was closed at the end of the 2009-2010 school year. The school later reopened in 2015 as an elementary school.
 Woodlands Elementary

Private education
Ponca City has three private schools that serve students from pre-K through eighth grade:
 Ponca City Christian Academy
 First Lutheran School
 St. Mary's Catholic School

Higher education
 Pioneer Technology Center serves high school and adult students from throughout the surrounding area. PTC also has co-operative degree programs with Northern Oklahoma College and Cowley County Community College
 University Center (UC) at Ponca City offers interactive television  classes from several area universities, including Northern Oklahoma College and Northwestern Oklahoma State University.  In 2018, the UC began an ambitious project seeking to create STEM opportunities for younger students to encourage a higher-education pursuit.  In December 2018, Phillips66 awarded the UC an $85,000 grant for the purchase of additional robotics kits and equipment to further develop the UC's STEM initiatives.

Research facilities
 Ponca City is the headquarters for Oklahoma State University's University Multispectral Laboratory.

Infrastructure

Electricity
The Ponca City region receives electricity generated hydroelectrically at Kaw Lake, a United States Army Corps of Engineers project. The facility, located 7 mi (11 km) east of Ponca City, dams the Arkansas River. The electric utility is managed by the Oklahoma Municipal Power Authority of Edmond, Oklahoma.

Transportation
The city is accessible by I-35, US-60, US-77, US-177 and OK-11.

On Grand Avenue (Business US-60), a series of new lamp posts is intended to look more classic. This project also replaced every traffic light along Grand Avenue except the traffic signals at 14th St. and at Waverly to match the new lamp posts.

Airports
The local airport booster club hosts a fly-in breakfast every first Saturday of the month, year around, "rain or shine".

Commercial air transportation is available out of Stillwater Regional Airport about 40 miles to the south, Wichita Dwight D. Eisenhower National Airport about 89 miles to the north, or Tulsa International Airport about 101 miles to the southeast.

Notable people

 Douglas Blubaugh, 1960 Olympic gold medalist in freestyle wrestling
 Mike Boettcher, news correspondent, CNN and NBC
 Lou Clinton, Major League Baseball (MLB) player
 Don Coleman, offensive lineman in College Football Hall of Fame
 Stanley Ann Dunham, mother of U.S. President Barack Obama
 Richard E. Killblane, military historian and author
 Jon Kolb, former offensive lineman with Pittsburgh Steelers
 Candy Loving, Playboy model, January, 1979, magazine's 25th-Anniversary Playmate
 E. W. Marland, businessman and politician
 Gale McArthur, All-American basketball player at Oklahoma State University
 W. H. McFadden, oilman and philanthropist
 Jake McNiece (1919–2013), a US Army paratrooper in World War II, was the leader of the Filthy Thirteen, an elite demolition unit whose exploits inspired the novel and movie The Dirty Dozen.
 Don Nickles, former United States Senator
 Gayla Peevey, child singer ("I Want a Hippopotamus for Christmas")
 Bill Pickett, cowboy
 Don Puddy, NASA flight director
 Mark and Rusty Ryal, father and son MLB players
 Kareem Salama, country and western singer
 Clint Sodowsky, MLB player
 Standing Bear, Poncan Native American leader
 Anthony Taylor, Catholic bishop of the diocese of Little Rock, Arkansas
 Joyce Carol Thomas, children's author
 Lew Wentz, oilman and philanthropist
 Shelby Wilson, 1960 Olympic gold medalist in freestyle wrestling
 Waddy Young Walter Roland Young 1916 - 1945 An All-American football player with the Brooklyn Dodgers (NFL) who volunteered to fly the B-29 in World War II

Gallery

In popular culture
Ponca City was one of the filming locations for 1996 movie Twister.

The 2020 children’s film “Adventures of Rufus: The Fantastic Pet” was largely filmed at the Marland Mansion.

A film about E. W. Marland was expected to be in production to shoot in Ponca City, titled The Ends of the Earth. The film was to star the Academy Award winner Jennifer Lawrence, and was originally expected to start in 2014.  However, as of July 2020, Internet Movie Database continues to list the movie only as "in development."

Several scenes from American Gods (TV series) were shot in Ponca City.

Sister cities
 Baiyin, Gansu, China

See also

 List of oil refineries

References

External links

 
 Ponca City News
 Ponca City Development Authority
 Ponca City and its Century-Old Oil Refining History
 Calendar of Events in Ponca City
 Barack Obama's Mother, Stanley Ann Dunham, Grew Up in Ponca City
 Oklahoma Digital Maps: Digital Collections of Oklahoma and Indian Territory

Populated places established in 1893
1893 establishments in Oklahoma Territory
Cities in Oklahoma
Cities in Kay County, Oklahoma
Micropolitan areas of Oklahoma
Ponca
Oklahoma populated places on the Arkansas River